Jernej Vrtovec (born 24 May 1985) is a Slovenian politician. Currently a member of the National Assembly representing New Slovenia, he served as Minister of Infrastructure in the 14th Government of Slovenia from March 2020 to June 2022.

References 

Living people
1985 births
Place of birth missing (living people)
Infrastructure ministers of Slovenia
21st-century Slovenian politicians